Tahkuranna was a rural municipality in Pärnu County, southwestern Estonia. It existed from 1991 to 2017, while from 1991 to 1995 it bore the name of Uulu Parish (Uulu vald). During the administrative reform (:et)  in 2017, Tahkuranna Parish was merged with neighbouring Häädemeeste Parish, the latter keeping its name.

Settlements
Small borough
Võiste

Villages
Laadi - Leina - Lepaküla - Mereküla - Metsaküla - Piirumi - Reiu - Tahkuranna - Uulu

References

External links
 Tahkuranna Parish official website 

Former municipalities of Estonia